WUNI (channel 66) is a television station licensed to Marlborough, Massachusetts, United States, broadcasting the Spanish-language Univision network to the Boston area. It is owned by TelevisaUnivision alongside Derry, New Hampshire–licensed True Crime Network affiliate WWJE-DT (channel 50); Entravision Communications operates WUNI under a joint sales agreement (JSA), making it sister to Worcester, Massachusetts–licensed UniMás affiliate WUTF-TV (channel 27). WUNI and WWJE share studios and transmitter facilities on Parmenter Road in Hudson; under the JSA, master control and some internal operations of WUNI are based at WUTF's studios on 4th Avenue in Needham.

History

As an English-language independent station 
The station first signed on the air on January 1, 1970, as WSMW-TV, an independent station that featured English general entertainment programs including old movies (including the entire series of Abbott and Costello movies and the Bowery Boys/Dead-End Kids movies starring Huntz Hall), cartoons, religious shows (including the Jacob Brothers and The PTL Club), a cooking show (Cooking with Bernard), science fiction shows (such as Gerry Anderson's UFO), dramas (including Maverick and Thriller), as well as sitcoms (including The Phil Silvers Show and Petticoat Junction). Though WSMW-TV was within the Boston market, it was far enough from Boston itself that the station was able to air some of the same shows as the Boston stations, in a similar situation to WMUR-TV (channel 9), the ABC affiliate in Manchester, New Hampshire. The station's call letters stood for State Mutual (Insurance Co.) in Worcester, the corporate owner of the station.

WSMW also broadcast sports programs; from its debut through the end of the 1971–72 NBA season, the station was the television home of the Boston Celtics. In 1970 and 1971, WSMW broadcast (same-weekend tape-delayed coverage of) New England Patriots preseason games. WSMW also offered extensive coverage of college basketball throughout the 1970s, mostly games of the College of the Holy Cross and Assumption College, with some Boston College, University of Massachusetts Amherst, and Bentley College games included on the schedule. The broadcast team of play-by-play man Bob Fouracre and analyst Bob Cousy worked these games. During the college football season, the station carried a taped two-hour broadcast of a game from earlier in the day on Saturday nights at 10:30 p.m. These games were typically Holy Cross home games, and when Holy Cross was on the road, games from UMass. Fouracre worked these games, and the analyst most of the time was Gino Cappelletti. WSMW also broadcast Bay State Bowling, a weekly candlepin bowling program on Sunday evenings for most of the 1970s, which was hosted by Fouracre.

In 1970, shortly after the cancellation of the long-running Bozo's Circus on WHDH-TV, WSMW-TV debuted their own version of the Bozo the Clown series franchise, Bozo's Big Top. Tom Matzell played Bozo, alongside Gene Sanocki as Bozo's sidekick Professor Tweetyfoofer. Local children were featured on the program daily, with many waiting up to one year or more for their chance to be on the show. This version aired until 1974.

In the fall of 1980, channel 27 began running the subscription television service Preview at night after 7 p.m. In February 1983, the station expanded Preview to begin weekday programming at 5 p.m. and 2 p.m. weekends. Then on July 1, 1983, the station dropped all of its entertainment programs and began running Preview 21 hours a day, with the remaining hours 6 to 9 a.m. (in the morning) devoted to religious and public affairs programming. In the spring of 1985, WSMW cut Preview's broadcast hours down to 7 p.m. to 3 a.m. on weekdays and after 3 p.m. on weekends; it also brought back some general entertainment programs. Hill Broadcasting bought the station in late 1985, and changed the station's call letters to WHLL. At that time, WHLL dropped Preview and reverted to being a general-entertainment independent full-time.

Initially, WHLL's schedule consisted of B-grade movies, drama series, public domain cartoons and a few sitcoms, as well as religious programs. While the station again initially shared some of its programming with Boston stations, by the fall of 1986 the duplication had largely been eliminated, and WHLL began to market itself as a Boston station. When cartoons and sitcoms were gone around 1987, the station began running preempted network programming from NBC, ABC, and CBS (that were declined by WBZ-TV channel 4; WCVB-TV channel 5; and WNEV-TV channel 7, now WHDH), which had previously aired on Boston's WQTV (channel 68, now WBPX-TV) and started airing BBC and Nine Network shows as well as airing new cartoons. The graphics were made by Cranston/Csuri and Pacific Data Images in 1989, which was less expense than BBC has. WHLL also began running some first-run syndicated shows by 1988, as well as a good amount of religious programming. During the station's tenure as WHLL, it employed WMJX radio personality David Allan Boucher as its booth announcer.

Addition of Spanish programming and Univision affiliation 
In 1992, the station added Spanish programming as a part-time affiliate of Telemundo, with the network's programming running from 4 or 5 p.m. until about 1 a.m. By 1993, when the Jasas Corporation acquired the Hill Broadcasting stations, WHLL ran Spanish-language programs after noon; much of the remaining English-language programming consisted of preempted network shows and religious programs. That year, the station became an Univision affiliate and changed its call letters to WUNI. In 1995, the station began carrying Spanish language programming full-time. The station was purchased by Entravision Communications in 2000.

On February 18, 2011, Rhode Island cable provider Full Channel TV, Inc. (now known as i3 Broadband) dropped WUNI from its systems and replaced the station with Univision's national feed on its digital cable tier; the impetus for the removal was a breakdown in negotiations over claims that Entravision demanded "a 33% increase in retransmission fees" as a cash payment to renew its carriage deal with WUNI.

On December 4, 2017, as part of a channel swap made by Entravision Communications, WUNI and sister station WUTF swapped channel numbers, with WUNI moving from digital channel 29 and virtual channel 27 to digital channel 27 and virtual channel 66.

On November 30, 2022, it was announced that WUNI will convert to ATSC 3.0.

News operation 

WUNI presently broadcasts 2½ hours of locally produced newscasts each week (with a half-hour each on weekdays; the station does not produce a late evening newscast on any night nor any news programs on Saturdays and Sundays). As WSMW, the station produced a nightly 6 p.m. newscast. This program was anchored by Doug White; Walter Cryan of WPRI-TV in Providence, Rhode Island liked White's work on the newscast and hired him away from WSMW-TV; White subsequently became a longtime news anchor at another Providence station, WJAR.

On April 1, 2003, WUNI launched a half-hour local newscast, Noticias Univision Nueva Inglaterra (Univision News New England), at 6 p.m. Sara Suarez was brought from Univision's Denver owned-and-operated station KCEC to serve as anchor and news director. Angel Salcedo, who hosted WUNI's public affairs program Enfoque Latino for several years, was chosen as Suarez's co-anchor. However, Salcedo left the station shortly afterwards, leaving Suarez as the sole anchor until Carlos Ruben Zapata was hired as Salcedo's replacement. In 2005, Zapata left the station and eventually hired Eduardo Guerrero as co-anchor late that year. Before the newscast debuted, the station signed a news share agreement with New England Cable News, in which the regional cable news channel provided news footage.  In addition, several commercial spots for NECN aired on WUNI and Telefutura-affiliated sister station WUTF-TV (which Univision owns, but is operated by Entravision), targeted at both stations' Hispanic audience.

The agreement with NECN expired in mid-2005, WUNI then signed a content sharing agreement with CBS owned-and-operated station WBZ-TV (channel 4). WBZ is acknowledged with an on-air credit when news footage supplied by the station appears on WUNI's newscasts, as well as at the end of the broadcast, before the copyright tag.

In April 2007, WUNI began producing news updates under the title Despierta Boston (which was anchored by Maria Gonzalez), during Univision's morning news/talk program Despierta América at :25 minutes past the hour from 7 to 9 a.m. The station used a modified version of the Despierta America logo branding, while using an alteration of the graphics and music package used on the 6 p.m. newscast. While Despierta Boston was relatively successful, economic problems led to Entravision discontinuing the morning updates in early 2009. The station also laid off Eduardo Guerrero (once again resulting in Sara Suarez anchoring solo) and 10-year veteran sports journalist Omar Cabrera.

On July 14, 2007, the station began airing the weekend edition of Univision-owned San Juan, Puerto Rico station WLII's newscast Las Noticias Univision; this was subsequently dropped.

Notable former on-air staff 
Upton Bell – college football color commentator (1978–1982)
Doug Brown – sports anchor (1982–1983)
Gino Cappelletti – college football color commentator
Bob Cousy – college basketball color commentator
Cy Follmer – sports anchor, Boston Celtics play-by-play announcer, New England Patriots play-by-play announcer (1970–1971)
Bob Fouracre – sports anchor, Bay State Bowling host, Boston Celtics play-by-play announcer, college football and basketball play-by-play announcer (1971–1982)
Stephen Guptill – elderly affairs reporter, host of The Elder American (1971–1975)
Togo Palazzi – college basketball color commentator
Doug White – news anchor (1970–1972)

Technical information

Subchannels 
The station's ATSC 1.0 channels are carried on the multiplexed digital signals of other Boston television stations:

Analog-to-digital conversion 
WUNI shut down its analog signal, over UHF channel 27, on June 12, 2009, the official date in which full-power television stations in the United States transitioned from analog to digital broadcasts under federal mandate. The station's digital signal continued to broadcast on its pre-transition UHF channel 29. Through the use of PSIP, digital television receivers display the station's virtual channel as its former UHF analog channel 27.

ATSC 3.0 lighthouse

See also 
 Channel 27 virtual TV stations in the United States
 Channel 29 digital TV stations in the United States
 List of television stations in Massachusetts

References

External links 

Univision network affiliates
Bounce TV affiliates
GetTV affiliates
Ion Mystery affiliates
Twist (TV network) affiliates
UNI
Television channels and stations established in 1970
1970 establishments in Massachusetts
UNI
Entravision Communications stations
Marlborough, Massachusetts
Mass media in Middlesex County, Massachusetts
ATSC 3.0 television stations